Published in Philadelphia, the Hispanic Review is the oldest peer-reviewed academic journal dedicated to research in Hispanic, Catalan and Luso-Brazilian literature and culture published in North America. The journal has published continuously since 1933 when it was created to replace the French journal  that had just stopped publication. Since its creation the journal has been edited by the Department of Romance Languages at the University of Pennsylvania. The journal is published quarterly by the University of Pennsylvania Press. It is available online through Project MUSE and JSTOR. The current general editor is Professor Ignacio Javier López, the Edwin B. and Lenore R Williams Professor of Romance Languages at the University of Pennsylvania. Professor López returned to this position in 2019 having served earlier as General Editor of the journal between 1997-2004. Russell P. Sebold has been the longest-serving editor, having directed the journal continuously for over twenty-nine years. Román de la Campa, Barbara Fuchs, Yolanda Martinez San Miguel, Jorge Salessi and Michael Solomon have also served as editors in the past.

Current issues of the journal are available electronically through Project MUSE; earlier issues can be found through JSTOR.

References

External links 
 
Journal page on JSTOR
Journal page on Project MUSE

Cultural journals
Quarterly journals
Publications established in 1933
Multilingual journals
University of Pennsylvania Press academic journals
Latin American studies journals